Pub names are used to identify and differentiate traditional drinking establishments. Many pubs are centuries old, and were named at a time when most of their customers were illiterate, but could recognise pub signs. The use of signage was not confined to drinking establishments. British pubs may be named after and depict anything from everyday (particularly agricultural) objects, to sovereigns, aristocrats and landowners (shown by their coats of arms). Other names come from historic events, livery companies, occupations, sports, and craftsmen's guilds. One of the most common pub names is the Red Lion.

Irish pubs tend to be named after the current or former owner. In Australia a high proportion of older pubs have names ending in "hotel", and generally their names reflect hotel naming conventions.

This list contains both contemporary/modern and historical examples.

Methodology 

Although the word "the" appears on much pub signage, it is ignored in the following examples; the word "ye' is likewise ignored as it is only an archaic spelling of "the". "Y" represents an obsolete character (þ, the letter Thorn, which is nowadays used only in Icelandic) for the th sound. Its later forms resembled a blackletter y, and it was never pronounced with a y sound. Similarly, other archaic spellings such as "olde worlde" are not distinguished below.

Animals 

Names like Fox and Hounds, Dog and Duck, Dog and Gun, Hare and Hounds, etc., refer to shooting and hunting. Animal names coupled with colours, such as White Hart and Red Lion, are often heraldic. A white hart featured as a badge of King Richard II, while a red lion was a badge of John of Gaunt and the Dukes of Bedford amongst others and a blue boar of the Earls of Oxford. Exceptions do exist, however, along with less obvious examples of the form - a combination of both features being Cross Foxes (a name most commonly found in rural Wales), referring to a darker-furred breed of the common Red Fox whose pelts were considered more valuable and sometimes worn as a sign of status.

 Bald Faced Stag Inn, Finchley. An inn notorious as frequented by murderers in the past.
 Barking Dogs, Hoxton (closed). (Also, various Barking Dog pubs). Named after the canine burglar deterrents.
 Bear Inn, Reading.
 Black Bear, Walsoken : actually, had a black bear (stuffed) at the entrance to the premises years ago.
 Black Birds, Barnwell, Cambridgeshire. Named after the bird.
 Black Horse, Chester-le-Street : some may be named in memory of a black horse ridden by Dick Turpin, however many including this one predate the event.
 Bull Inn, Stamford : the town was the last in England to practice bull-running.
 Bustard Inn, South Rauceby.(closed). After the bird of that name, once numerous.
 Chameleon, Wisbech (now closed).
 Crane, Cambridge. After the bird of that name, once numerous in The Fens. Crane is one of the nicknames for the inhabitants.
 Dog, Westhall, Suffolk.
 Dolphin, Wisbech, Isle of Ely (now closed) : dolphins were caught and presented to the lord of the manor in earlier times; however, it may just be a nautical reference to the port, or a corruption of "Dauphin" in honour of military victories over Napoleon in France (see later section).
 Dove, Ipswich : a biblical source.
 Four Swans, Butchers Market, Cambridge (closed down).
 Greyfriars Bobby, Scotland. Named after a local dog of popular legend.
 Heathcock Tavern, Strand : named after a game bird.
 Lobster, Sheringham. Patronised by the lifeboat crew who formed the Shanty Men.
 Old Ram, Tivetshall St. Mary.
 Olde Fighting Cocks, St. Albans. Named for the cocks used in fights and for gambling.
 Ostrich Inn, Castle Acre. Named after the flightless bird.
 Packhorse and Pig, Aldergate Street, London 
 Pickerel Inn, Cambridge : named after young pike (Esox lucius).
 Py'd Bull, Lincoln (closed). This pub was advertised as convenient for drovers in the 18th century. The Pied Bull in Chester in reputed to be the oldest licensed house in the city and dates back to 1155.
 Pyewipe Inn, Lincoln. Pyewipe is the Lincolnshire dialect name for the lapwing.
 Red-Hart Inn, Petty Cury, Cambridge (closed). Claimed to have the only cockpit in the town.
 Rein Deer, Lincoln (closed).
 Roebuck Inn, Chesterton. Named after the male of the species Capreolus capreolus.
 String of Horses, Spalding (closed).
 Swan and Falcon Inn, Gloucester (closed).
 Ugly Bug, Colton.

Branding 

Some pub chains in the UK adopt the same or similar names for many pubs as a means of brand expression. Examples include "The Moon Under Water", commonly used by the JD Wetherspoon chain (and inspired by George Orwell's 1946 essay in the Evening Standard, "The Moon Under Water"), and the "Tap and Spile" brand name used by the now defunct Century Inns chain. The "Slug and Lettuce" is another example of a chain of food-based pubs with a prominent brand; founder Hugh Corbett had owned a small number of pubs, to which he gave humorous or nonsensical names, with the effect of differentiating them from competitors.

Found objects 

Before painted inn signs became commonplace, medieval publicans often identified their establishments by hanging or standing a distinctive object outside the pub. A fictional example of this otherwise real-life practice can be found in Terry Pratchett's Discworld series of books, where the pub in Ankh Morpork starts off as The Drum, becomes The Broken Drum after a bar fight damages it and then in later books The Mended Drum. This tradition dates back to Roman times, when vine leaves were hung outside tabernae to show where wine was sold.

 Boot Inn, Whittlesea 
 Boot and Slipper, Amersham.
 Crooked Billet, Portsmouth St, London (a bent branch from a tree)

Sometimes the object was coloured, such as Blue Post or Blue Door.

Heraldry 

The ubiquity of heraldic pub names shows how important heraldry has been in the naming of pubs. The simpler symbols of the heraldic badges of royalty or local nobility give rise to many of the most common pub names. Five common colours (heraldic tinctures) are gules (red); sable (black); azure (blue); vert (green); and purpure (purple). The metals are or (gold) and argent (silver), although in practice they are usually depicted as yellow and white.

Items appearing in coats of arms 

 Blue Boar, the name of many pubs in Westminster, Norwich, Billericay, Maldon, Witney and elsewhere, from the badge of the Earls of Oxford.
 Castle: sometimes originally referred to the Coat of Arms of Castile in Spain, and meant that Spanish wines were available within.
 Checkers or Chequer(s), March, Isle of Ely and many other sites : sometimes derived from the coat of arms of a local landowner (see Chequy), this name and sign originated in ancient Rome when a chequer board indicated that a bar also provided banking services. The checked board was used as an aid to counting and is the origin of the word exchequer. The last pub to use the older, now American spelling of checker was in Baldock, Hertfordshire, but this closed circa 1990; all pubs now use the modern "q" spelling (but see also Chequers, in Plants and horticulture below).
 Cross Keys, Wisbech, derived from the town's coat of arms and the town's church of SS. Peter & Paul.
 Eagle and Child, Oxford, derived from the arms of the Earls of Derby, was a meeting place of the Inklings.
 Rampant Horse (earlier Ramping Horse), Norwich : horses are popular pub signs and names.
 Red Lion is the name of over 600 pubs. It thus can stand for an archetypal British pub. The lion is one of the most common charges in coats of arms, second only to the cross, and thus the Red Lion as a pub sign probably has multiple origins: in the arms or crest of a local landowner, now perhaps forgotten; as a personal badge of John of Gaunt, founder of the House of Lancaster; or in the royal arms of Scotland, conjoined to the arms of England after the Stuart succession in 1603.
 Spread Eagle: from the heraldic depiction of an eagle 'displayed'; probably derived from the arms of Germany, indicating that German wines were available within.
 Swan, Wisbech a badge of many Lancastrian figures—see Dunstable Swan Jewel
 Talbot or Talbot Arms refers to an actual breed of hunting dog, now extinct, which is also a heraldic hound, and is the badge of the Talbot family, Earls of Shrewsbury. Old Talbot, Wisbech (now closed)
 White Hart: the livery badge of King Richard II of England. It became so popular as an inn sign in his reign that it was adopted by many later inns and taverns.

Livery companies 

Names starting with the word "Three" are often based on the arms of a London Livery company or trade guild :

 Three Arrows: The Worshipful Company of Bowyers
 Three Bucks: The Worshipful Company of Leathersellers
 Three Castles: The Worshipful Company of Masons
 Three Compasses: The Worshipful Company of Carpenters
 Three Crowns: The Worshipful Company of Drapers, although it can also refer to the Magi, the Diocese of Ely or the three crowns of East Anglia.
 Three Cups: The Worshipful Company of Salters
 Three Fishes: The Worshipful Company of Fishmongers
 Three Goats' Heads: The Worshipful Company of Cordwainers
 Three Hammers: The Worshipful Company of Blacksmiths
 Three Horseshoes: The Worshipful Company of Farriers
 Three Tuns: The Brewers and the Worshipful Company of Vintners
 Three Wheatsheafs: The Worshipful Company of Bakers

Landowners 

Many landowners' coats of arms appear as pub signs.

 Duke of Bedford, Wisbech, Isle of Ely: (now closed) named for the person draining the fens.
 Hardwicke Arms, Wisbech (now closed Down) - the Earl of Hardwicke KG MP being Lord Lieutenant and Custos Rotulorum.
 Osborne, Wisbech, Isle of Ely: (now closed) named for the residence of a local family.
 Prince Albert, Wisbech, Isle of Ely: (now closed) named for the prince consort.
 Queen Victoria, Wisbech, Isle of Ely : named for the monarch.
 Royal Standard, Wisbech, Isle of Ely : named for royal family.
 Stanley Arms, Huyton, near Liverpool: after Frederick Stanley, 16th Earl of Derby.
 Marshland Arms, Wisbech, Isle of Ely: (now closed) named for a nearby council. 
 Melbourne Arms, Duston, Northampton: after former local landowner Lord Melbourne
 Tollemache, Grantham : named after Frederick Tollemache
 Wisbech Arms, Wisbech: (now closed) named for the local borough.

Occupations 

See also Trades, tools and products below
Some "Arms" signs refer to working occupations. These may show people undertaking such work or the arms of the appropriate London livery company. This class of name may be only just a name but there are stories behind some of them. An "arms" name, too, can derive from a local authority.

 Blacksmith's Arms, (Wisbech) with the pun of the actual blacksmiths arms and their strength.
 Brewers Arms, Wisbech. The town had and has several breweries.
 Carpenters Arms - A series of pubs, related to the occupation or more likely to the guild of carpenters.
 Cooper's Arms, Little Old Bailey - Worshipful Company of Coopers.
 Drover's Inn, Loch Lomond, Scotland. Named after the cattle drivers. Also an example in Caerleon, near Newport, Wales.
 Glazier's Arms, Stamford (closed).
 The Gravel Diggers, Cottenham (closed).
 Jolly Gardeners, Hertford (closed).
 Lathrenders' Arms, Wisbech, Isle of Ely. Nearby were lathe makers.
 Mason's Arms, Wisbech.
 Mechanics Arms (now renamed the Old Neighbourhood), near Stroud, Gloucestershire. In this context a mechanic was a bonesetter. Another was (now closed) in Stamford, Lincs 
 Millers Arms, Lincoln, Lincolnshire. Robert Taylor, the first publican in 1861, was a miller by trade.
 Porters Arms, (Wisbech), Isle of Ely.
 Printers Arms, (Wisbech) owned by a local newspaper owner.
 Pyrotechnists' Arms, a local gunpowder maker.
 Ratcatchers, Cawston, Norfolk.
 Recruiting Sergeant, Newton Harcourt
 Ropers' Arms, Wisbech, Isle of Ely. Now closed. At least two rope walks in the town.
 Ship Carpenters' Arms, Wisbech named for local shipbuilders trades.
 Shipwrights' Arms, Wisbech named for the men employed in the local shipbuilders.
 Spinners' Arms, Hindley Green, Wigan.
 Wire Workers' Arms, St. Neots, Hunts.

Historic events 

 Abdication, in Arnold : the reign and abdication of Edward VIII.
 Bhurtpore Inn, Aston, near Nantwich, Cheshire: commemorating the Siege of Bharatpur in Rajasthan, 1826. The Inn is on land formerly part of the estates of Lord Combermere, commander of British forces during the siege.

 Dolphin: often anglicised from the French Dauphin, commemorating battles in which England defeated France.  These include "The Dolphin" in Wellington, Somerset which was named in honour of Wellington's victory at the Battle of Waterloo. 
 Hand and Shears: this famous City of London pub got its name owing to Bartholomew Fair.  Tailors would gather in the pub the night before the fair and wave their shears announcing that the fair should begin.
 Magna Charta in Lowdham, Nottinghamshire, has its name spelled differently from the historic document after which it is named.
 Man on the Moon, Northfield, Birmingham: originally called The Man in the Moon and renamed on the day of the first moon landing in 1969.
 Battle of Minden, Portsmouth (closed): named after this historic military engagement.
 Rose and Crown:  Edward III used a golden rose as a personal badge, and two of his sons adapted it by changing the colour: John of Gaunt, 1st Duke of Lancaster, used a red rose, and Edmund of Langley, 1st Duke of York, used a white rose. The dynastic conflicts between their descendants are collectively called the Wars of the Roses. In 1485 Henry Tudor, a descendant of Lancaster, defeated Richard III of the York dynasty and married Richard's niece Elizabeth of York. Since then, the combined red-and-white Tudor rose, often crowned, has been a symbol of the monarchy of England.

 Royal Oak: After the Battle of Worcester (1651) in the English Civil War, the defeated Prince Charles escaped the scene with the Roundheads on his tail. He managed to reach Bishops Wood in Staffordshire, where he found an oak tree (now known as the Boscobel Oak near Boscobel House). He climbed the tree and hid in it for a day while his obviously short-sighted pursuers strolled around under the tree looking for him. The hunters gave up, Prince Charles came down and escaped to France (the Escape of Charles II). He became Charles II on the Restoration of the Monarchy. To celebrate this good fortune, 29 May (Charles' birthday) was declared Royal Oak Day and the pub name remembers this. The Royal Naval ship HMS Royal Oak gets its name from the same source. Early ships were built of the heartwood of oak.

 Saracen's Head and Turk's Head: Saracens and Turks were among the enemies faced by Crusaders. This is also a reference to the Barbary pirates that raided the coasts from the Crusades until the early 19th century.
 Trafalgar: commemorating the Battle of Trafalgar. There are many pubs called the Nelson, and an Emma Hamilton pub in Wimbledon Chase where Nelson lived with her. A famous pub is the Trafalgar Tavern, part of the Greenwich Maritime World Heritage site at Greenwich.

Literature

Names from books 

 Cat and Custard Pot in Shipton Moyne is said to originate from the book Handley Cross or Mr Jorrocks's Hunt by R. S. Surtees.
 Jabez Clegg in Manchester, now closed, was named after the title character in Isabella Banks' novel The Manchester Man.
 Hobbit in Southampton, named after J. R. R. Tolkien's creation and threatened with legal action by US movie lawyers, because of this.
 Lass O' Gowrie in Manchester, named after the poem by Carolina Nairne.
 Moon and Sixpence pubs in Portland, Oregon; Whitby, North Yorkshire; Harrow, Middlesex; and Soho, London are named after Somerset Maugham's novel of the same name.
 Moon Under Water, inspired by George Orwell's essay describing his perfect pub
 Muppet Inn, Wisbech, Isle of Ely: (now the Globe) named for the TV series, books and comics.
 Paul Pry Inn, Peterborough. Named after the main character in the play of that name.
 Peveril of the Peak, in Manchester, commemorates a stagecoach that once connected Manchester and London, but the pub itself claims it is named for the novel by Sir Walter Scott.
 Sherlock Holmes in Charing Cross, London contains a reproduction of the great detective's study.
 Three Pigeons, Norwich and other locations. Used in a number of books and plays e.g. Charles Dickens' Our Mutual Friend (1864–65).
 Herbert Wells in Woking, a town that was fictionally destroyed by Martian invaders in H. G. Wells's The War of the Worlds. A 25' (7.6-metre) tall statue of a Martian stands in Chobham Road in the town, and a Martian is depicted in a drawing in the pub.
 Edgar Wallace, The Strand, London, named for the 1930s mystery writer.
 John Masefield in New Ferry, named for the former Poet Laureate who served for some years on a naval training ship, HMS Conway, off New Ferry pier.
 Uncle Tom's Cabin, Reach, Cambridgeshire : from the book of that name.

Pubs in books from real-world pubs 

 The Ivy Bush is a "small inn on the Bywater road" near Hobbiton in The Shire in J. R. R. Tolkien's The Lord of the Rings. Here Gaffer Gamgee recounted to the other regulars his stories about Bilbo and Frodo Baggins, who were about to throw a magnificent joint birthday party. The most likely real-world source is an Edgbaston pub called the Ivy Bush, near where Tolkien lived when he was growing up in Birmingham.
 The Fortune of War, Smithfield was located on "Pie Corner" (where the Great Fire of London stopped) and was frequented by Resurrectionists including the  London Burkers, two of whom, John Bishop and Thomas Williams were hanged for murder, after they sold the bodies for dissection. The pub is mentioned in William Makepeace Thackeray's 1848 Vanity Fair.

Myths and legends
Images from myths and legends are evocative and memorable.
 Black Bess: usually named after the legendary overnight ride from London to York in 1737 by Dick Turpin on his Mare of this name. This fictional account was popularised in a novel, Rookwood (1834), resulting in a surge of Dick Turpin nostalgia and associated pub names.
 Brazen George Inn, Cambridge (closed). Named after England's patron Saint.
The Bucket of Blood, is a public house in Phillack, Hayle, Cornwall, owned by St Austell Brewery. It is thought to be named after an incident where the landlord brought up a bucket of blood from the building's well, as a murdered smuggler had been dropped there.
 Fiddler's Green, a legendary place in the afterlife where existence consists of all leisure and no work.
 George and Dragon: St George is the patron saint of England and his conflict with a dragon is essential to his story. This sign is a symbol of English nationalism.
 Green Dragon, Wisbech, Wymondham etc.: a couple of a number of pubs of this name.
 Green Man: a spirit of the wild woods. The original images are in churches as a face peering through or made of leaves and petals; this character is the Will of the Wisp, the Jack of the Green. Some pub signs will show the green man as he appears in English traditional sword dances (in green hats). The Green Man is not the same character as Robin Hood, although the two may be linked. Some pubs which were the Green Man have become the Robin Hood; there are no pubs in Robin's own county of Nottinghamshire named the Green Man but there are Robin Hoods. The 1973 film The Wicker Man features a Green Man pub.
 Hob in the Well, King's Lynn: pubs of this name can come from Hobgoblin in the well or Dogget's play Flora: or, Hob in the Well (1748).
 Moonrakers: In the 17th century, some Wiltshire yokels hid their smuggled liquor in the Crammer (a pond in Devizes) and used rakes to recover their stash. They were caught in the act by customs officials, and they claimed they were trying to rake in a cheese, which was in fact the reflection of the full moon. The customs officials left thinking that the locals were a bit simple, whilst the locals recovered the smuggled goods without any more interference. The name Moonrakers has been used as a nickname for Wiltshire folk ever since and is the name of pubs in Devizes and Swindon.
 Robin Hood, sometimes partnered by his second in charge to form the name Robin Hood and Little John. Other Robin Hood names can be found throughout Arnold, Nottinghamshire. These were given to pubs built in the new estates of the 1960s by the Home Brewery of Daybrook, Nottinghamshire: Arrow, Friar Tuck, Longbow, Maid Marian and Major Oak.
 Silent Woman, Quiet Lady or Headless Woman: The origin is uncertain, with various local stories, such as a landlady whose tongue was cut out by smugglers so she couldn't talk to the authorities, or a saint beheaded for her Christianity. The pub signs sometimes have an image of a decapitated woman or the couplet: "Here is a woman who has lost her head / She's quiet now—you see she's dead".

Paired names

Common enough today, the pairing of words in the name of an inn or tavern was rare before the mid-17th century, but by 1708 had become frequent enough for a pamphlet to complain of 'the variety and contradictory language of the signs', citing absurdities such as 'Bull and Mouth', 'Whale and Cow', and 'Shovel and Boot'. Two years later an essay in the Spectator echoed this complaint, deriding among others such contemporary paired names as 'Bell and Neat's Tongue', though accepting 'Cat and Fiddle'. A possible explanation for doubling of names is the combining of businesses, for example when a landlord of one pub moved to another premises. Fashion, as in the rise of intentionally amusing paired names like 'Slug and Lettuce' and 'Frog and Firkin' (see Puns, Jokes and Corruptions below) in the late 20th century, is responsible for many more recent pub names.

 Black Boy and Trumpet, Peterborough. (Now closed).
 Boot and Shoe in March, Isle of Ely
 Butcher and Beast, Heighington : claims to be the only one of this name in England.
 George and Vulture Tavern. St. Michael's Alley, Cornhill, London.
 Goat and Boot Inn, Colchester.
 Harp and Horn, Edgware Road: later the Welsh Harp, finally the Old Welsh Harp after another pub named the Welsh Harp was opened. The Welsh Harp railway station (now closed and demolished) was named after the pub (which closed in 1971).
 Pink and Lily, Princes Risborough. Named after flowers.
 Plough and Sail, Marshland Smeeth. (closed Down).
 Snipe and Duck, Exmoor Drive, Upwell.(closed).
 Swan and Woolpack, near Stamford.

Personal names or titles 

 Duke of Bedford, Wisbech.
 Rupert Brooke, Grantchester named after the soldier poet.
 Catherine Wheel, Henley-on-Thames, Manea and other locations: purportedly from Katherine Whele, in other locations evolved from The Wheel or other derivations.
 Clarkson, Wisbech, Isle of Ely: named for the local antislavery campaigner Thomas Clarkson.
 French Horn, Stepping : thought to be a corruption or nickname of 'Frenchman de Schorne'. However, there were also other pubs with this name e.g. Upton.
 Four Jacks, Wisbech. The former Shipwrights Arms. Renamed after the new landlord Jack Johnson and his three sons. The four playing cards were used in adverts etc.
 Garrick public house, Cambridge (closed down). Named after the famous actor. Linked to the 1876 murder of Emma Rolfe by Robert Browning.
 Hoste Arms, Burnham Market. Named for Sir George William Hoste, who served under Nelson.
 Marquis of Granby: a general in the 18th century. He showed a great concern for the welfare of his men upon their retirement and provided funds for many ex-soldiers to establish taverns, which were subsequently named after him.
 Hardwicke Arms, Wisbech : named after local nobility.
 Lord Nelson: Quite a common name (in various forms) throughout England but especially in Norfolk, where the admiral was born. The Hero of Norfolk at Swaffham, Norfolk, portrays Nelson as did Norfolk Hero at Wisbech.
 John H Stracey, Brixton near Holt. 16th inn named after the former landlord, a boxer. Has now reverted to its former name.
 Guy Earl of Warwick, in Welling, Dartford, dates from at least 1896. and is thought to be the "Halfway House" which appears in Charles Dickens' 1861 Great Expectations.
 Sir Norman Wisdom, Deal, Kent. Named after the actor who worked as an errand boy locally.
 The Shakespeare, Redland, Shakespeare's Tree, Bidford-on-Avon, Warwickshire: Used to celebrate the Bard's genius. 
 Walpole Arms, Itteringham. Named after Robert Walpole, Britain's first prime minister.
 General Wolfe, Laxfield : named after the military hero.

Places 

 The Australia Inn, Tydd St. Giles (closed) supposedly named as the intended destination of a former occupant.
 The Chislett, Long Sutton, Lincolnshire. Formerly The Ship, the pub was renamed by the new owners after their relations originating from the village of Chislett in Kent.
 Horse Shoe Hole Inn, Leverington was located near the River Nene horse shoe feature.
 Tavistock Inn, as for example at Poundsgate, Dartmoor.
 Twelve Pins or Na Beanna Beola (Finsbury Park, London): the Twelve Pins mountain range in the west of Ireland.

Plants and horticulture 

The most common tree-based pub name is the Royal Oak, which refers to a Historical event.

 Artichoke Tavern, Blackwall refers to a plant.
  Flower Pot, Mirfield, Maidstone, Kent, Aston, Oxfordshire, Henley-on-Thames and Wisbech, Isle of Ely. Flowerpots, Cheriton, Hampshire.
 Hand and Flower, Hammersmith, London, also Ham, Surrey. Hand and Flowers, Marlow.
 Rose Tavern, a pub in Wisbech, Isle of Ely.
 Vine or Grapes possibly harks back to the Roman custom of displaying a vine outside a tavern or wine-shop, as in The Hoop and Grapes in Aldgate High Street, London (reputed to be the city's oldest pub) and the Vine, Wisbech (now closed).
 Wheatsheaf, a Wetherspoon pub in Wisbech.
 Yew Tree, Bassingbourne. Named for Taxus baccata the English Yew.

Politically incorrect 

 All labour in vain or Labour in vain. At various locations. Probably of Biblical origins, in past times the name was often illustrated by a person trying to scrub the blackness off a black child. Such signs have been mostly replaced with more innocuous depictions of wasted effort.
 There are numerous old pubs and inns in England with the name of the Black Boy(s), many now claimed to refer either to child chimneysweeps or coal miners, or to a (genuine) historic description of King Charles II. The Black Boy Inn in Caernarfon, North Wales, has received at least a dozen complaints from visitors over the name, which dates back at least 250 years. In 2021 brewer Greene King changed the names of three pubs called The Black Boy, and another called The Black's Head.
 The Black Bitch, a pub in Linlithgow, West Lothian, is named after the local legend of a black greyhound who is said to have repeatedly swum to an island in the town's loch to bring food to its imprisoned master, only to suffer the same fate when its efforts were discovered. The pub's name has caused more than a few surprised tourists to question the name or decry it as racist.

The pub itself

The pub building 

 Hippodrome : a former cinema. This March, Isle of Ely premises was once a cinema.
 Hole in the Wall. The official name or nickname of a number of very small pubs. One such at Waterloo, London, is spacious but built into a railway viaduct. The Hole in the Wall, Gibraltar was an iconic bar well frequented by the navy workers.
 Hundred House Inn (later Hotel), Great Witley. The hotel name originates from centuries ago when the Hundred House was a collecting house for the tithes gathered from districts in the Doddingtree Hundred.
 Lattice House, King's Lynn. Historic pub named for its timbered structure.
 Porch House, Stow-on-the-Wold. Named after the front of the building.
 The Steps, Glasgow. Named after the steps outside.
 Thatched House Tavern, Cambridge, named after the building.
 Three Legged Mare, High Petergate, York, named after the design of a gallows, an example of which may be found in the pub's garden; affectionately known as the Wonky Donkey.
 Vaults, a number of pubs, not all having vaults as an architectural feature; the word also had the general meaning of 'storeroom'.

Services provided by the pub 

 Coach & Horses, for a coaching inn
 Farriers Arms, for a pub with a farrier who could re-shoe the traveller's horses
 Free Press, named for when part of the building in Cambridge was used to print a newspaper.
 Horse & Groom, where the traveller's horse would be cared for while the traveller drank
 Pewter Platter, Cross Street, Hatton Gardens (now closed), for a pub where meals were served.
 Stilton Cheese Inn : named for the cheese sold locally that led to the cheese acquiring its name of Stilton cheese.
 Wheelwrights, for a pub where a coach's wheels could be repaired or replaced

Beer and wine 

Many traditional pub names refer to the drinks available inside, most often beer.

 Barley Mow: a stack (or sheaf) of barley, the principal grain from which beer is made.
 Barrels: A cask or keg containing 36 Imperial gallons of liquid, especially beer. Other sizes include: pin, 36 pints; firkin, 9 gallons; kilderkin, 18 gallons; half-hogshead, 27 gallons; hogshead, 54 gallons; butt, probably 104 gallons.
 Brewery Tap: A pub originally found on site or adjacent to a brewery and often showcasing its products to visitors; although, now that so many breweries have closed, the house may be nowhere near an open brewery.
 Burton Stingo, Wisbech thought to be named after the Burton ales and Stingo on sale within.
 Bushel (and New Bushel), Wisbech, Isle of Ely:  named after a unit of volume used in a corn exchange to trade including barley used in brewing.
 Cock and Bottle, or simply Cock: The stopcock used to serve beer from a barrel, and a beer bottle.
 Coffee Pot Inn, (Downham Market) : another popular drink.
 (Sir) John Barleycorn: A character of English traditional folk music and folklore, similar to a Green Man. He is annually cut down at the ankles, thrashed, but always reappears—an allegory of growth and harvest based on barley.
 Leather(n) Bottle: A container in which a small amount of beer or wine was transported, now replaced by a glass bottle or can.
 Malt Shovel: A shovel used in a malting to turn over the barley grain.
 Mash Tun: a brewery vessel used to mix grains with water.
 Pint Shop : unit of volume.
 Three Tuns: Based on the arms of two City of London guilds, the Worshipful Company of Vintners and the Worshipful Company of Brewers.
 The Tankard, London. Named after the drinks container.

Food 

Other pub names refer to items of food to tempt the hungry traveller. For example, The Baron of Beef in Cambridge refers to a double sirloin joined at the backbone.
 Red Herring, Great Yarmouth. Named after Red Herring a product of the local fishing industry.
 Shoulder of Mutton, Wisbech is another pub named for a joint of meat.

Puns, jokes and corruptions

Although puns became increasingly popular through the twentieth century, they should be considered with care. Supposed corruptions of foreign phrases usually have much simpler explanations. Many old names for pubs that appear nonsensical are often alleged to have come from corruptions of slogans or phrases, such as "The Bag o'Nails" (Bacchanals), "The Cat and the Fiddle" (Caton Fidele) and "The Bull and Bush", which purportedly celebrates the victory of Henry VIII at "Boulogne Bouche" or Boulogne-sur-Mer Harbour. 

 Axe and Gate: Possibly from "ax (or ask) and get".
 Beartown Tap, Congleton, Cheshire. 'Beartown' is the nickname for Congleton, as local legend claims its townsfolk once 'sold the bible to buy the bear', that is, spent money set aside to buy a parish Bible on providing bear-baiting at their fair.
 Bird in-hand, Wisbech. Alludes to the expression.
 Buck and Ear in the Steveston area of Richmond, British Columbia. The name alludes not only to the maritime heritage of the area but also to a previous establishment at the same location that was called "The Buccaneer".
 Bull and Mouth: Believed to celebrate the victory of Henry VIII at "Boulogne Mouth" or Harbour. Also applies to Bull and Bush (Boulogne Bouche).
 Case is Altered: The title of an early comedy by Ben Jonson, first published in 1609, based on a remark by lawyer Edmund Plowden which entered into common currency. Also said to be a corruption of the Latin phrase Casa Alta ('high house') or Casa Altera ('second house'). There are several examples in England, such as at Hatton, Warwickshire The Case is Altered (now closed) and a later new build pub 'The Case' also now closed both in Wisbech, Isle of Ely.
 Cat and Fiddle: a corruption of Caton le Fidèle (a governor of Calais loyal to King Edward III). Alternatively from Katherine la Fidèle, Henry VIII's first wife.

 Elephant and Castle: By folk etymology, a corruption of "la Infanta de Castile". It is popularly believed amongst residents of Elephant and Castle that a 17th-century publican near Newington named his tavern after the Spanish princess who was affianced to King Charles I of England. The prohibition of this marriage by Church authorities in 1623 was a cause of war with Spain so it seems unlikely to have been a popular name. A more probable and prosaic explanation is that the name derives from the arms of the Worshipful Company of Cutlers, a London trade guild; an elephant carrying a castle-shaped howdah can also be seen on the arms of the City of Coventry.
 Goat and Compass[es]: Possibly based on the arms of the Worshipful Company of Cordwainers, whose coat of arms contains three goats, together with the Worshipful Company of Carpenters, whose coat of arms contains three compasses. (either that, or from "God encompass us")
 Paraffin Oil Shop (now closed), at the crossing of A5080 and B5179 in eastern Liverpool, Google Earth view: So, people could say that they are going to buy paraffin.
 Pig and Whistle: a corruption of the Anglo-Saxon saying piggin wassail meaning "good health".
 Swan With Two Necks: In England and Wales, wild mute swans swimming in open water have traditionally been the property of the reigning monarch, who had the right to grant swan marks. In the 16th century, Queen Elizabeth I granted the right to ownership of some swans to the Worshipful Company of Vintners. To tell which swan belonged to whom, the Vintners' swans' beaks would be marked with two notches, or nicks. The word 'nick' was mistaken for 'neck', and so the Vintners spotted that a Swan With Two Necks could afford them a rather clever pun, and a striking pub sign. When Swan Upping is carried out nowadays rings are used in lieu of nicking beaks.

Religious 

The amount of religious symbolism in pub names decreased after Henry VIII's break from the church of Rome. For instance, many pubs now called the King's Head were originally called the Pope's Head.

 Adam & Eve, Norwich. The city's oldest pub.
 Anchor, Hope & Anchor, Anchor & Hope, Anchor of Hope,: From the Letter to the Hebrews (6:19): "We have this as a sure and steadfast anchor of the soul, a hope."
 Blackfriars, Wisbech (closed): named after the Blackfriars of the town.
 Cardinal's Hat, Harleston, Norfolk.
 Shaven Crown, at Shipton under Wychwood. One belonged to monks.
 Shepherd & Flock may refer to Christ (the Shepherd) and the people (his flock) but may also just mean the agricultural character and his charges.
 Six Ringers, Leverington - named after the bells (or bell ringers needed) in the St.Leonards' church.
 Virgin's Inn, Derby : named after the Virgin Mary.

Royalty 

Royal names have always been popular (except under the Commonwealth). It demonstrated the landlord's loyalty to authority (whether he was loyal or not), especially after the restoration of the monarchy.

 King of Prussia, Gosport: named after Frederick the Great
 Queen of Bohemia, Wych Street, London. A former pub named after Elizabeth, daughter of James I and Anne of Denmark.
 Three Queens Inn, Burton : named after three royal ladies.

Ships 

 The Fishing Buss, Southwold. Named after a type of fishing vessel.
 Lifeboat Inn, Holme-Next-The-Sea. A smuggler's Inn named after the rescue boat.
 Old Ferryboat, Holywell, Cambridgeshire 
 Pilot Boat, Bembridge, Isle of Wight, Southwold, and Lyme Regis, Dorset
 Ship Defiance, Wisbech, Isle of Ely: (now closed) 
 Steam Packet Tavern, Rose Corner, Norwich.

Sports

Hunting and blood sports 

 Anglers' Beerhouse, Wisbech. The fens are noted for the coarse fishing facilities.
 Bird in Hand: the bird sitting on the left gauntlet in falconry.
 Dog and Duck where duck-baiting events were held.
 Fighting Cocks (or just 'Cock'): Cockfighting; but the fighting cock also could be a heraldic charge. Ye Olde Fighting Cocks in Saint Albans rivals Ye Olde Trip to Jerusalem in Nottingham for the title of oldest pub; its name advertised actual cockfighting entertainment in the pub.
 Fox and Hounds (or 'Dog and Fox'): Fox hunting
 Gin Trap Inn, Hunstanton. After the animal trap.
 Greyhound: for Henry VIII's favourite hunting dog among others

 Hark to Bellman: Clitheroe later (1826) the Bellman Inn, named after a hound of the huntsman John Peel, as were the Hark to Bounty in Slaidburn, and the Hark to Towler in Bury; in fox hunting, "hark to" meant to listen.
 Rabbits, Gainsborough : a frequent object of shooting.

Other Sports 

 Bowling Green—Bowls has been for many years a popular sport in the Manchester area: many of the greens are attached to pubs, e.g. the Lloyd's Hotel and the Bowling Green Hotel in Chorlton-cum-Hardy. The Bowling Green Hotel in Grafton Street, Chorlton on Medlock, no longer has a green.
 Nine Pins, Cambridge (now closed), a former Star Brewery pub, named after the sport.
 Popinjay Inn, Norwich : a Popinjay is a target used in archery.
 Wrestlers: Great North Road, Hatfield, Hertfordshire and Wisbech (now closed) named for the sport.

Topography

 Barrack Tavern, Woolwich Common: near the army barracks.
 Bridge Inn (often preceded by the name of a bridge) - located near a river or canal bridge: historically these were good places to establish a pub due to passing traffic on both the road and the water. Bridge and Bridge Inn were both to be found in Wisbech, Isle of Ely (now closed).
 Bunch of Carrots, Hampton Bishop. Named after a rock formation.
 Castle: usually a prominent local landmark, but sometimes a heraldic device: see under "Heraldry", above. Castle, Wisbech, Isle of Ely; (now closed) named after the succession of castles, bishops palaces and villas that occupy a site to this day known as The Castle.
 Fosdike Inn, near Boston : named after the village of Fosdyke, itself named after an early watercourse.
 Horsefair Tavern, Wisbech (closed and for sale. 2021). Named after the Horsefair (now a shopping mall, formerly a site for selling horses). Former uses included as a Liberal Club and a youth club.
 First and Last, nickname of The Redesdale Arms, the nearest pub to the border between England and Scotland, on the A68 between Rochester and Otterburn in Northumberland.
 Five Miles from Anywhere Inn: No Hurry, Upware. An isolated hostelry.
 North Pole beerhouse, Wide Bargate, Boston, Lincolnshire. (closed)
 Harbour Hotel, Wisbech, Isle of Ely. next to the harbour.
 Nene Inn, Wisbech, Isle of Ely. Near the river of the same name.
 Theatre Tavern, Gosport. Both theatre and adjacent tavern had the same owner.
 Turnpike: named for a former toll point, as in Turnpike hotel, Wisbech.
 West End, Wisbech, Isle of Ely: (now renamed BLUES), a pub on the West of the town.
 Windmill: a prominent feature of the local landscape at one point. Pubs with this name may no longer be situated near a standing mill, but there's a good chance they're close to a known site and will almost certainly be on a hill or other such breezy setting. Clues to the presence of a mill may also be found in the naming of local roads and features. The Windmill in Wisbech, Isle of Ely was next to the site of a windmill.

Trades, tools and products

 Axe 'n Cleaver inn Much Birch, or Altrincham, also Boston, Lincolnshire and North Somercotes.
 Bankers, near Walpole St. Andrews, West Norfolk. Named after those involved in making and maintaining the seabanks and riverbanks.
 Blackfriars, Wisbech: named for the local friars. (now closed) 
 Blind Beggar, a pub in Whitechapel named for the story of Henry de Montfort 
 Brewers Arms, Wisbech: (now closed) named for the local brewing industry.
 British Rifleman, Wisbech : (now closed) named for the British Army infanteers equipped with rifles.
 Chemic Tavern (formerly Chemical Tavern), Leeds, West Yorkshire. Named for the workers at the nearby Woodhouse Chemical Works, (C. 1840–1900) it was a beer house on the 1861 census when the licensee was James Lapish.
 Custom House Tavern, Wisbech: (now closed) named for the local customs post in the port.
 Engineers Tavern, Wisbech: named for the local rail industry.
 Fen Plough, Chatteris : named after the local farming equipment.
 Golden Fleece, for the wool trade
 Harbour Hotel, Wisbech: (now closed) named for the local maritime industry.
 Jolly Nailor in Atherton, Greater Manchester, named after nail manufacture, present in the area since the 14th century.
 Lathrenders Arms, Wisbech, Isle of Ely: (now closed) named for the local lathe industry.
 The Light Horseman, York. Named for a former cavalry barracks.
 Locomotive, Wisbech: named for the former local rail industry.
 Malt Shovel, Three Holes Bridge, Upwell (now closed). Named for brewing implement.
 Masons Arms, Wisbech: (now closed) named for the local masonry industry.
 Midland Counties, Wisbech: named for Midland and Great Northern Joint Railway one of the local railway companies.
 Porters Arms, Wisbech, Isle of Ely: (now closed) named for the local porters.
 Printers Arms, Wisbech, Isle of Ely: (now closed) named for the local print industry. 
 Railway Inn, Wisbech: named for the local rail industry. (now closed)
 Ram Skin, Spalding, Lincolnshire (now closed). Named for the local wool industry, closed in 1970.
 Rifle Volunteer, Oxhey village, Gunnislake etc.
 Ropers Arms, Wisbech: (now closed) named for the former local rope making industry.
 Ship carpenters Arms, Wisbech, Isle of Ely: (now closed) named for the local ship building industry.
 Ship Inn from Irvine to Oundle. However, the Ship Inn in Styal, Cheshire, states that its derivation is from 'shippon', a cattle shed or manure shed.
 Shipwrights  Arms, Wisbech: (now closed) named for the local boatbuilding industry.
 Sailor, Addingham near Ilkley; Jolly Sailor at St Athan and at Sandown, Isle of Wight.
 Sailor's Return, Wisbech, Isle of Ely: (now closed) named for the local shipping industry.
 Spade and Becket, Chatteris, (now closed) Isle of Ely, and Cambridge (closed), Downham Market (closed): a combination of two peat digging implements.
 Tappers Harker (Long Eaton, Nottingham): a railway worker who listened to the tone of a hammer being hit onto a railway wagon wheel, to check its soundness. Similar to the Wheeltappers and Shunters fictional pub of the 1970s show.
 Three Jolly Butchers, Wisbech, Isle of Ely: named for the local meat industry.
 Town and Gown Cambridge, Cambridgeshire, is named for the non-academic and academic communities of the city respectively.
 Three Jolly Watermen, Waterbeach Fen (now closed): named for local water workers.
 Trowel and Hammer, Norwich : thought to be named after local bricklayers.
 Two Brewers, Diss : takes its name from the beer makers.
 Valiant Sailor, King's Lynn named for the mariners of this port.
 Volunteers Arms, Llanidloes (closed). One of many pubs named after Militia or rifle volunteers etc.
 Woodman or Woodman's Cottage Inn.
 Woolpack Banstead, Surrey and Wisbech, Isle of Ely. (now closed) Not an uncommon name in sheep country such as the Banstead Downs. Wisbech and the fens both raised sheep and exported the wool through the Port of Wisbech, named for the local sheep industry.

Transport

Air

 Airman, (currently closed) Feltham, Middlesex, and Henlow, Bedfordshire: named owing to their proximity to the former London Air Park (latterly Hanworth Air Park) and RAF Henlow respectively.
 Balloon, (closed) Stamford. The balloonist Mr. H.Green had made a number of ascents in the vicinity in previous years.
 Canopus, Rochester, Kent: Named after the flying boats produced at the nearby Short Brothers aircraft factory (now demolished).
 Comet, Hatfield, Hertfordshire: In the 1950s the pub sign depicted the de Havilland DH.88 wooden monoplane racer named "Grosvenor House", famous for its winning of the 1934 McRobertson Cup air race from England to Australia and for its distinctive Post Box red colour. Also known as the DH Comet, this plane is not a precursor of the famous civilian jet airliner of the same name, but rather of the WW2 fast bomber, the de Havilland Mosquito
 Flying Bedstead, Hucknall, Nottinghamshire: Name given to the prototype aircraft which eventually led to the development of the Harrier VTOL jet.
 Flying Boat (now demolished) in Calshot, Hampshire, commemorated the part that the area played in the development of these aircraft between 1920 and 1940.
 Red Arrow, Lutterworth, Leicestershire: a pub with a sloping triangular roof, named after the RAF aerobatics team. The pub was formerly called the "flying saucer" for its unusual shape, and has also been described as a Star Destroyer from the Star Wars films.

Road

 Bullnose Morris, Cowley, Oxfordshire: Named after the motor cars once produced at the nearby factory.
 Highway Inn, Burford. On the King's Highway.
 I am the Only Running Footman, Mayfair, London W1; named after a servant employed by the wealthy to run ahead of their carriages and pay tolls.
 Steamer, Welwyn, Hertfordshire: It is found at the top of a steep hill where carriers required an extra horse (a cock-horse) to help get the wagon up the hill. After its exertion the cock-horse could be seen standing steaming on a cold day as its sweat evaporated.
 Waggon and Horses: Another simple transport name (prior to American influence, the British English spelling of 'wagon' featured a double 'g', retained on pub signs such as this one).
 Wait for the Waggon, Bedford and Wyboston, Bedfordshire: This is the name of the regimental march of The Royal Corps of Transport (now The Royal Logistic Corps), whose troops frequently use this route; the latter is sited on the Great North Road.

Water 

 Black Buoy, Wivenhoe. Originally named after King Charles II and later renamed after a type of Channel marker buoy, as the owners had nautical connections.
 Locks Inn, Geldeston. Named for the nearby locks.
 Shroppie Fly: Audlem, named after a type of canalboat called a 'Shropshire Fly'
 Tide End Cottage: in Teddington, at the end of the tidal reach of the River Thames

Other 

  Air Balloon, Birdlip, Gloucestershire. Near a field where early ascents were made.
  Rusty Bicycle, new name of the Eagle in Oxford. Oxford's students often cycle round the town.

Most common 

An authoritative list of the most common pub names in Great Britain is hard to establish, owing to ambiguity in what classifies as a pub as opposed to a licensed restaurant or nightclub, and so lists of this form tend to vary hugely. The two surveys most often cited, both taken in 2007, are by the British Beer and Pub Association (BBPA) and CAMRA. As pubs have closed in response to changing habits, numbers have fallen, so the historic surveys remain of interest.

According to BBPA in 2007, the most common names were:

Red Lion (759)
Royal Oak (626)
White Hart (427)
Rose and Crown (326)
King's Head (310)
King's Arms (284)
Queen's Head (278)
The Crown (261)

According to CAMRA in 2007 they were at that time:

Crown (704)
Red Lion (668)
Royal Oak (541)
Swan (451)
White Hart (431)
Railway (420)
Plough (413)
White Horse (379)
Bell (378)
New Inn (372)

A more current listing can be found on the Pubs Galore site, updated daily as pubs open/close and change names. In 2019, the top 10 were:

Red Lion (558)
Crown (509)
Royal Oak (432)
White Hart (317)
Swan (296)
Plough (294)
Railway (294)
White Horse (286)
Kings Arms (245)
Ship (244)

Curiosities 

The pubs with the shortest and longest names in Britain are both in Stalybridge: Q and The Old Thirteenth Cheshire Astley Volunteer Rifleman Corps Inn. The longest name of a London pub, I am the Only Running Footman, was used as the title of a mystery novel by Martha Grimes.

There is a "pub with no name" in Southover Street, Brighton, and another near to Petersfield, Hampshire, so known (despite having an actual name), because its sign on the nearest main road has been missing for many years.

The Salley Pussey's Inn at Royal Wootton Bassett is said to have been named after Sarah Purse, whose family owned The Wheatsheaf pub in the 19th century. In the 1970s the name was changed to the Salley Pussey's.

See also 
 List of pubs in Australia
 List of pubs in the United Kingdom

References

Sources 

  Brewer, E. Cobham (1898) Dictionary of Phrase and Fable. London: Cassell and Co.
  Cox, Barrie (1994) English Inn and Tavern Names. Nottingham: Centre for English Name Studies, 
  Dunkling, Leslie (1994) Pub Names of Britain, London: Orion (1994), 
  Dunkling, Leslie & Wright, Gordon (2006) The Dictionary of Pub Names. Ware: Wordsworth Editions 
  Myrddin ap Dafydd (1992) Welsh Pub Names. Llanrwst: Gwasg Carreg Gwalch  (Translation of: Enwau tafarnau Cymru)
  Wright, Gordon & Curtis, Brian J. (1995) Inns and Pubs of Nottinghamshire: the stories behind the names. Nottingham: Nottinghamshire County Council

Further reading 

 [Anonymous] (1969) Inn Signs: their history and meaning. London: the Brewers' Society
 Douch, H. L. (1966) Old Cornish Inns and their place in the social history of the County. Truro: D. Bradford Barton
 Richardson, A. E. (1934) The Old Inns of England. London: B. T. Batsford

External links 

 The Inn Sign Society
 Collection of images of Pub Signs
 Brewery Arts, a short history of studio inn signs

Pubs
Names